Propamidine is an antiseptic and disinfectant.

Propamidine isethionate, the salt of propamidine with isethionic acid, is used in the treatment of Acanthamoeba infection.

Propamidine is a member of the aromatic diamidine group of compounds which possess bacteriostatic properties against a wide range of organisms.   These diamidines exert antibacterial action against pyrogenic cocci, antibiotic resistant staphylococci and some Gram-negative bacilli, the activity of the diamidines being retained in the presence of organic matter such as tissue fluids, pus and serum.

References

Amidines
Antiseptics
Antiparasitic agents
Phenol ethers